Iron Staff Lama (1993) is an oil painting created by Zhang Yan in Tibet, China. 
It depicts that a lama carries an iron staff with him when inspecting and disciplining the monks.

It is collected by the Vatican Museums permanently in May 2017.

Background 
The lama with an iron staff, known as “dge-bskos” in Tibetan, are in charge of monitoring registers and disciplines at the monasteries of the Dratsang monks. They are officially referred to as the disciplinarian or the monastery monitor. 

Historically, they often carried an iron staff with them when inspecting and disciplining the monks, which gained them the name of the “Iron Staff Lama”.

This is Zhang Yan's first oil painting. Because the cloth used in oil painting must be primed before drawing, and Tibet was lack of supplies at that time, the primer of this painting was specially formulated by him using local minerals at an altitude of 4000 meters in Tibet.

Content 
In the painting, the lama's silver hairs represent the snowy crowns of the Tibetan mountains, and his piercing sights cast high at the ‘roof of the world’ that see through all things in the world, suggesting the persistence, intelligence, cultural confidence and pride of the Tibetan people. 

The lama has an expression of determination and resolve on the face carved with wrinkles in ways resembling the highland of Tibet carved with its gullies and trenches and reminding viewers of the endeavor and courage of the Tibetan people, and their harmonious co-existence with the nature. 

The artist applied paints in a sculpturing approach, to create a painting that presents an untamable tension in the art, and guides people to take a discerning perspective in seeking the ultimate answers to some of the eternal questions on “people and nature” and “flesh and soul”. From within, the unique enchantment of Tibetan culture in China is shown.

Iron Staff Lama is collected by the Vatican Museums permanently in May 2017, which is the first living artist's work permanently preserved by the Vatican Museum.

Episode 
During the process of donation to the Vatican Museums, an episode occurred. Zhang Yan originally planned to donate his painting The Cradling Arm to the Pope, but when Vatican Museums experts came to Beijing to identify it, they were stunned by the beauty of the painting Iron Staff Lama. In this way, both The Cradling Arm and Iron Staff Lama are collected by the Vatican Museum. For Zhang Yan, the surprises in life are always unexpected, and the experience is often the most beautiful thing.

References 

Oil paintings
1993 paintings